Japan competed at the World Games 2017  in Wroclaw, Poland, from 20 July 2017 to 30 July 2017.

Competitors

American Football
Japan has qualified at the 2017 World Games in the American Football Men Team event.

Gymnastic

Rhythmic Gymnastics
Japan  has qualified at the 2017 World Games:

Women's individual event - 2 quotas

Trampoline
Japan has qualified at the 2017 World Games:

Men's Synchronized Trampoline - 1 quota 
Women's Synchronized Trampoline - 1 quota

Karate

Japan  has qualified at the 2017 World Games:

Men's Individual Kumite -84 kg - 1 quota (Ryutaro Araga)
Men's Individual Kumite +84 kg - 1 quota (Hideyoshi Kagawa)
Men's Individual Kata - 1 quota (Ryo Kiyuna)
Women's Individual Kumite -50 kg - 1 quota (Ayaka Tadano)
Women's Individual Kumite -68 kg - 1 quota (Kayo Someya)
Women's Individual Kata - 1 quota (Kiyou Shimizu)

Lacrosse

Japan has qualified at the 2017 World Games in the Lacrosse Women Team event.

Sumo

Japan has qualified at the 2017 World Games:

Men's Lightweight - 1 quota  
Men's Middleweight - 1 quota
Men's Heavyweight - 1 quota
Women's Lightweight - 1 quota 
Women's Middleweight - 1 quota
Women's Heavyweight - 1 quota

References 

Nations at the 2017 World Games
2017 in Japanese sport
2017